Hello Young Lovers is the 20th album by Sparks. A continuation of the repetitious, orchestral sound of their previous album Lil' Beethoven, though with a much greater emphasis on guitar and drums, It is a concept album which addresses aspects of modern love.

Release
Hello Young Lovers was commercially more popular than any Sparks album since the 1970s, and it reached #66 on the UK Album Chart. The album did not chart in the US. The album was released on CD and both white and pink vinyl. The CD was initially released on Gut records, and then later released on In The Red records.

Two singles and an EP were released to promote the album. The first; "Perfume" was backed with an alternative version of "(Baby, Baby) Can I Invade Your Country" and a remix by Clor. It peaked at #80 on the UK Singles chart and #10 on the UK Independent Singles Chart.

"Dick Around" was released as an EP in the US, and as a double a-side single with "Waterproof" in the UK. Both versions featured an edited version of "Dick Around" and the US version included live tracks recorded earlier that year in Los Angeles. The UK release of the song fell foul of a ban by the BBC, who took issue with the title citing it as obscene. Sparks issued a statement; "In a reaction [to the ban] the band says: "The BBC has officially killed off our new single Dick Around, ostensibly through rather childish objections to the title, an innocent reference to the idle life. That a piece of music can be condemned purely by its title without the 'decision makers' even having the decency to open the CD case is a travesty and an insult to both us as the creators of the music and to the listeners of the BBC." Eventually, In a statement BBC London said that the track is back in rotation. The single charted at #139 in the UK.

Re-release 
In April 2022, a remastered Hello Young Lovers was issued on LP, CD and digital as part of the five album "21st Century Sparks" collection. The CD and digital releases contain two bonus tracks: An alternative version of "(Baby, Baby) Can I Invade Your Country" previously released as a B-side, and a cover of "We Are The Clash" recorded for an Uncut Magazine tribute to The Clash in 2003. 

It entered the UK Independent Albums Chart at no. 14.

Track listing

Personnel
 Ron Mael - keyboards, orchestrations and production
 Russell Mael - vocals, engineering and production
 John Thomas - mixing and additional engineering
 Tammy Glover - drums
 Dean Menta - guitars
 Jim Wilson - additional guitar
 Steven Shane McDonald- additional bass

Chart placings
Album

Perfume (single)

Dick Around (single)

References

External links
Sparks - Hello Young Lovers

2006 albums
Sparks (band) albums
Concept albums
Albums recorded in a home studio